Arthur Voaden Secondary School (often abbreviated as AVSS) is a high school in St. Thomas, Ontario, Canada. Voaden is part of the Thames Valley District School Board.

History

Originally named as simply Arthur Voaden Vocational School, it was one of the first vocational schools in Ontario. It was constructed in a time where secondary school was considered a privilege, and was meant for those entering university or white-collar jobs. Arthur Voaden, M. D., a native of nearby Talbotville, was a man that wanted to give educational opportunities to all. Initiating this project to build AVS as one of few "down-graded" vocational schools around did create some friction, with debate over the Flora Street site, and the fears of costs. However, after a year of construction, the doors were opened in September 1926.  It did struggle in its early years, especially due to the Great Depression, when employment was scarce, and even trained and experienced workers had difficulty. It did slowly gain acceptance, and proved invaluable during World War II. The war made for a manpower shortage to a point where even second and third year students were plucked from the school to fill the void. The school created special twelve-week courses to train adults for war work, and war emergency classes were made available year-round.

Dr. Voaden was principal of the school from its opening until he died in 1931. His remains were laid in state at the school.

Present day
AVSS is a composite school that offers all graduation pathways including university, college, apprenticeships, and the workplace. It is also Elgin County's Emphasis Technology School, offering more programming in Communications Technology, Health Care, Hospitality and Tourism, Construction/Woodworking, Hairstyling and Aesthetics, and Manufacturing than any other school in the county.  It also offers a number of Specialist High School Majors, where students can earn a red seal on their OSSD by participating in specific training and related courses.

Arthur Voaden has been highly regarded for its arts programs, including the exceptional visual art department. At one time, the Arthur Voaden Vikings football team was highly successful.

Notable alumni
 Dan Cloutier – attended Voaden for the 1991–1992 school year while playing for the Jr B St. Thomas Stars as a 15-year-old.  He was drafted by the Sault Ste. Marie Greyhounds of the OHL in 1992, and then by the New York Rangers of the NHL 26th overall in 1994, and has played for the New York Rangers, Tampa Bay Lightning, Vancouver Canucks, and Los Angeles Kings.
 Stephen Ouimette – attended Voaden from 1968 to 1972
Terry Wilson (hate crime investigator)

See also
List of high schools in Ontario

Footnotes

External links
The Arthur Voaden Homepage

High schools in St. Thomas, Ontario
Educational institutions established in 1926
1926 establishments in Ontario